Elida Almeida (born 1993) is a Cape Verdean singer.

Biography

Elida Sofia Cabral Almeida was born in Pedra Badejo in the east of Santiago Island. She spent her childhood years with some difficulty, in the mountains of Santiago.  At 17, she sang at church, she listened to the radio, she said on that she grew up on a place without electricity or necessities.  She worked on radio commentaries, especially with DJs and presenters.  She started writing her album Nta Konsiqui

She later presented at local concerts and sang at bars in Cape Verde where she started her career.  The producer José da Silva, a resident of France with Cape Verdean origins, who had previously worked with Cesária Évora, was interested in her career. Almeida’s style is different from most famous Cape Verdean morna-coladeira singers. She is more influenced by funaná, batuque, rhythms created by deserted slaves decades ago, but has a different similarity for the expression.   Two years later, she made her first album Ora doci, Ora margos. In December 2014 she performed in Portugal and France; officially debuting later during 2015 in  France at Festival Musiques Métisses in Angoulême. She then went on to take the stage in Paris and the United States in the same month.  In November 2015, she was designated a laureate at the RFi awards, made by a jury chaired by the Malian singer Oumou Sangaré.  She produced mainly on the African continent even at the start of the Festival des musiques urbaines d'Anoumabo (FEMUA - Anoumabo Urban Music Festival) in Abidjan.

Elida Almeida was present at the 2016 Cabo Verde Music Awards (CVMA) together with Hélio Batalha.  A month later, she went to the 10th edition of JazzKif, the Kinshasa Jazz Festival.

Discography

Albums 
 Ora doci, Ora Margos (December 2014 - released by Harmonia in Cabo-Verde) 
 Ora doci, Ora Margos (May 2015 - released by Lusafrica in the rest of the world)
 Kebrada (October 2017 - released by Lusafrica)

Singles 
 "Txika" (July 2016 - Lusafrica)
 "Di Mi Ku Di Bo" (January 2017 - Lusafrica)
 "É Zonban" feat. Djodje (July 2017 - Lusafrica)

Duets 
 "Nhu Santiagu" with Lura in her album Herança (2015)

Collaborations with other artists
She collaborates with Nelly Cruz, a bass guitarist, Diego Gomes with keys, Magik Santiago with the drums and Hernani Almeida, a guitarist. They produced her first album Ora doci, ora morgas

References

Further reading
Newspaper articles
Églantine Chabasseur, Elida Almeida, ombre et lumière (Elida Almeida, Shadow and Light), Radio France International, 2 December 2015 
L. Daku, Revivez le concert de la lauréate du prix Découvertes RFI,  (Reviving the Concert by the Laureate of the RFi Awards, Elida Almeida), Radio France International, 4 April 2016 
A.D. McKenzie, Cape Verde's Newest Voice Sends Message to Girls, IPS, 11 June 2015
Ana Maria Ribeiro, Portugal ouve música neste fim de semana, Correio da Manhã 13 August 2016
Elida Almeida, le live de la matinale (Elida Almeida - Live in the Morning), France Musique, September 2016 

1993 births
Living people
21st-century Cape Verdean women singers
People from Santiago, Cape Verde